Idia is a genus of litter moths of the family Erebidae first described by Jacob Hübner in 1813.

Description
Palpi sickle shaped and slender, where the second joint reaching above vertex of head. Thorax and abdomen smoothly scaled. Tibia hairless. Forewings with round apex. Hindwings with vein 5 from lower angle of cell.

Species
Based on Lepidoptera and Some other Life Forms:
Idia aemula Hübner, 1813 – common idia moth, powdered snout moth or waved tabby moth
Idia americalis Guenée, 1854 – American idia moth or American snout moth
Idia calvaria Denis & Schiffermüller, 1775
Idia denticulalis (Harvey, 1875) – toothed idia moth
Idia diminuendis Barnes & McDunnough, 1918 – orange-spotted idia moth
Idia forbesii French, 1894 – Forbes' idia moth
Idia gopheri J. B. Smith, 1899 – tortoise commensal noctuid moth
Idia immaculalis (Hulst, 1886) – immaculate idia moth
Idia julia Barnes & McDunnough, 1918 – Julia's idia moth
Idia laurentii J. B. Smith, 1893 – Laurentine idia moth
Idia lubricalis Geyer, 1832 – glossy black idia moth
Idia majoralis J. B. Smith, 1895 – greater idia moth
Idia occidentalis (Smith, 1884)
Idia parvulalis Barnes & McDunnough, 1911
Idia rotundalis Walker, 1866 – chocolate idia moth, rotund idia moth
Idia scobialis Grote, 1880 – smoky idia moth
Idia suffusalis J. B. Smith, 1899
Idia terrebralis Barnes & McDunnough, 1912

Unpublished species
Idia concisa Forbes, 1954 or Idia sp. nr. aemula – pale-winged idia moth

References

Herminiinae
Moth genera